The 1985–86 Associate Members' Cup, known as the 1985–86 Freight Rover Trophy, was the third staging of the Associate Members' Cup, a knock-out competition for English football clubs in the Third Division and the Fourth Division. The winners were Bristol City and the runners-up were Bolton Wanderers.

The competition began on 14 January 1986 and ended with the final on 24 May 1986 at Wembley Stadium.

In the first round, there were two sections split into eight groups: North and South. In the following rounds each section gradually eliminates teams in knock-out fashion until each has a winning finalist. At this point, the two winning finalists faced each other in the combined final for the honour of the trophy.

Preliminary round

Northern Section

Southern Section

Quarter-finals

Northern Section

Southern Section

Area semi-finals

Northern Section

Southern Section

Area finals

Northern Area final

Southern Area final

Final

Notes
General
statto.com

Specific

1985–86
Tro